The Washington Park Handicap is an American Thoroughbred horse race held annually during the first week of September at Arlington Park Racetrack in Arlington Heights, Illinois. A Grade III event open to horses age three and older, it is contested on Polytrack synthetic dirt over a distance of a mile and one-eighth (9 furlongs). The race is designed to be a prep for the Breeders' Cup Classic.

Inaugurated at the now defunct Washington Park Race Track, in 1958 it was moved to Arlington Park. In 1978 and 1979 it was contested on turf.

In 1935 the race was run as the Washington Park Championship Stakes and from 1980 through 1985 as the Washington Park Stakes.

Since inception, the race has been contested at various distances:
 6 furlongs : 1927-1934, 1938;
 1 mile : 1951-1958, 1960–1962, 1965–1972;
  miles : 1939, 1959, 1963–1964, 1975–1977, 1980–1987, 1989–1997, 2000; 2013
  miles : 1978-1979 (on turf), 2002–present;
  : 1926, 1935–36, 1940–1950, 1973–74, 2001.

Records
Speed record: (at current distance of  miles )
 1:53.53 - Suave (2006) (Dirt)
 1:55.17 - Lewis Michael (2007) (Polytrack)
Record at 1 mile on dirt - 1:32.20 Dr. Fager (1968) - Note that this time broke the world's record at the distance on dirt. The record still stands

Most wins:
 2 - Misstep (1929, 1930)
 2 - Armed (1946, 1947)
 2 - That's A Nice (1979, 1980)
 2 - Perfect Drift (2003, 2005)
 2 - Gran Estreno (2009, 2010)

Most wins by a jockey:
 6 - Bill Shoemaker (1955, 1956, 1957, 1959, 1962, 1980)

Most wins by a trainer:
 3 - Harry Trotsek (1950, 1974, 1975)

Most wins by an owner:
 4 - Calumet Farm (1946, 1947, 1948, 1949)

Winners

* † In 1943 there was a Dead Heat for first.

References
 The 2007 Washington Park Handicap at the NTRA
 Ten Things You Should Know About the Washington Park Handicap at Hello Race Fans

Graded stakes races in the United States
Horse races in Illinois
Open middle distance horse races
Recurring sporting events established in 1926
Arlington Park
Washington Park Race Track
1926 establishments in Illinois